Kashap ( کاشاپ )  Tehsil Dasht, Kech District in Balochistan,Kashap is a small valley.
Its part of Makran division situated in  West of Dasht Kech.
Kashap band being south of Mand and Bal Nigwar on the west side.
The Inhabitants are sunni Muslims.
The tribes living in the valley are  Askani and Rind. The town is located in West of the Balochistan,    Balochistan, it is situated West  of Turbat close to Iranian border.

References

Populated places in Kech District